Since 1995, 85 commercial video games based on Lego, the construction system produced by The Lego Group, have been released. Following the second game, Lego Island, developed and published by Mindscape, The Lego Group published games on its own with its Lego Media division, which was renamed Lego Software in 2001, and Lego Interactive in 2002. The division also co-published with Electronic Arts before closing. Former Lego Interactive staff founded company Giant Interactive Entertainment for future Lego game publishing. Following the release of Lego Star Wars: The Video Game, Giant merged with Traveller's Tales to form TT Games. TT Games was acquired by Warner Bros. Interactive Entertainment (WBIE) in November 2007, making WBIE the primary publisher for Lego games.

Original games

Licensed properties

References

External links
 

 
Lego
Lego